Vyacheslav Anatoliyovych Orel (born on 5 September 1997) is a Ukrainian professional footballer who plays as a defensive midfielder.

References

External links
 
 
 

1997 births
Living people
Place of birth missing (living people)
Ukrainian footballers
Association football midfielders
FC Zorya-Akademia Bilozirya players
NK Veres Rivne players
FC Cherkashchyna players
FC Dnipro Cherkasy players
FC Kremin Kremenchuk players
Ukrainian First League players
Ukrainian Second League players
Ukrainian Amateur Football Championship players